Paul Reynolds is an Irish journalist. As of 2014, he is the crime correspondent for RTÉ News.

Reynolds has been on RTÉ's main news programmes, in both television and radio, almost daily for over a decade. He joined RTÉ in 1991 at the same time as Mark Little, Rachael English and Sean Whelan. In June 2009, he won the Political and Current Affairs Journalist of The Year from Irish National Media Awards.

His brother is Gerry Reynolds, also of RTÉ.

References

Year of birth missing (living people)
Living people
RTÉ newsreaders and journalists
21st-century Irish journalists